Nicholas Longworth was an American politician

Nicholas Longworth may also refer to:
Nicholas Longworth II (1844–1890), father of the politician
Nicholas Longworth (winemaker) (1783–1863), great-grandfather of the politician